Zhang Miao may refer to:

Zhang Miao (politician) (died 195), official in the late Eastern Han dynasty of China
Zhang Miao (cyclist) (born 1988), Chinese cyclist
Zhang Miao (table tennis) (born 1991), Chinese para table tennis player
Zhang Miao (1984–2010), murder victim in the Yao Jiaxin murder case